Barbaira is a commune in the Aude department in the Occitanie region of southern France.

The inhabitants of the commune are known as Barbairanais or Barbairanaises.

Geography
Access to the commune is by the D6113 road from Floure in the west which passes through the north of the commune and the village before continuing east to Capendu. The A61 autoroute passes through the centre of the commune from west to east but there is no exit in the commune. A railway passes through commune and the village from west to east but has no station in or near the commune. The commune is farmland in the north with the slopes of the mountain in the south forested.

The Aude river forms the northern border of the commune as it flows east to join the Mediterranean Sea south-west of Valras-Plage. Several streams rise in the south of the commune and flow north to join the Aude including the Ruisseau de la Pelliere. The Ruisseau de Saint-Jean rises in the far south-east of the commune and flows north then east to join the Ruisseau de la Tuilerie.

Neighbouring communes and villages

Heraldry

Administration

List of Successive Mayors

Mayors from 1936

Demography
In 2017 the commune had 750 inhabitants.

Economy

Industry
There is a Compressor station for the TIGF natural gas network.

Agriculture
The commune is part of the zone for the qualitative names:
Vin de pays des coteaux de Miramont (Vin de Pays from the slopes of Miramont)
Vignoble de la Montagne d'Alaric (Vineyards of Mount Alaric) which is part of the Corbières AOC

Culture and heritage

Civil heritage
The remains of the Chateau of Miramont (Middle Ages) are registered as an historical monument.

Religious heritage
The Church of Saint-Julien-Sainte-Basilisse (12th century) is registered as an historical monument. The Church contains two items that are registered as historical objects:
A Baptismal font (18th century)
A Statue: Virgin and child (17th century)

Notable people linked to the commune
Chabert de Barbeira

See also
 Corbières AOC
 Communes of the Aude department

References

External links
Barbaira on Géoportail, National Geographic Institute (IGN) website 
Barbaira on the 1750 Cassini Map

Communes of Aude